Recchia mexicana is a species of trees in the family Surianaceae. It is native to tropical habitats of Mexico.

References

Surianaceae
Flora of Mexico
Taxa named by José Mariano Mociño
Taxa named by Martín Sessé y Lacasta
Taxa named by Alphonse Pyramus de Candolle